Jackie Moore (1946 – November 8, 2019) was an American R&B singer. Born in Jacksonville, Florida, she is best known for her gold single 1970 song "Precious, Precious," which reached No. 30 on the Billboard Hot 100 chart on March 6, 1971. This disc sold over one million copies, and received a gold disc awarded by the R.I.A.A. in March 1971.

Also noteworthy was her 1979 disco hit "This Time Baby," which hit No. 1 on the Hot Dance Music/Club Play chart. The track reached No. 49 in the UK Singles Chart. The latter would later be sampled for the 2005 dance radio and club hit "Love on My Mind" by the Freemasons featuring Amanda Wilson. Moore also had a US pop chart hit (No. 42) with Bunny Sigler and Phil Hurtt's upbeat "Sweet Charlie Babe" in the fall of 1973, which she recorded with the Philadelphia Strings and Horns.

Career
Before her success at Atlantic Records and Columbia Records, Moore recorded for Wand Records which produced the single "Who Told You." Her debut "Dear John" was released on Shout Records in 1969.

Reviewing the 1973 Sweet Charlie Babe LP, Robert Christgau wrote in Christgau's Record Guide: Rock Albums of the Seventies (1981), "Figures that this should fall somewhere between state-of-the-art and great-mean soul: the five hits go back to 'Precious, Precious' in the winter of '71, with the two latest cut at a funkier-than-usual Sigma in Philadelphia and the others by a simpler-than-usual Crawford-Shapiro team at Criteria in Miami. Moore's voice is simultaneously sweet and rough, an unusual combination in a woman, and the songs are pretty consistent. But she lacks not only persona but personality, so that what in technical terms is pretty impressive stuff never goes over the top."

"This Time Baby" was a featured song in the video game, Grand Theft Auto: Vice City Stories.

Discography

Studio albums

Precious, Precious: The Best of Jackie Moore (1994, Ichiban)
The Complete Atlantic Recordings (2015, Real Gone Music)

Singles

See also
List of number-one dance hits (United States)
List of artists who reached number one on the US Dance chart

References

External links

American dance musicians
American disco musicians
American rhythm and blues musicians
Musicians from Jacksonville, Florida
1946 births
2019 deaths
Wand Records artists
Atlantic Records artists
Columbia Records artists
20th-century African-American women singers